Caulerpa urvilleana is a species of seaweed in the Caulerpaceae family.

The seaweed has a grass-green to dark-green thallus.

The species is found in tropical seas in the Indian and western Pacific Oceans. In Western Australia, it is found around the Dampier Archipelago.

References

urvilleana
Species described in 1845